Elena Malõgina (born 27 May 2000) is an Estonian tennis player.

Malõgina made her debut on the professional tour in 2016. She has a career-high doubles ranking of world No. 236, achieved on 7 November 2022, while her career-high WTA singles ranking is 347 (19 December 2022). She has won eight ITF doubles titles and three in singles.
 
Malõgina made her debut for Estonia Fed Cup team in 2018, and has a win–loss record of 2–14 in Fed Cup competitions.

Personal life
She was born in Saint Petersburg, Russia to an Estonian father and a Russian mother.

ITF Circuit finals

Singles: 6 (3 titles, 3 runner–ups)

Doubles: 17 (8 titles, 9 runner–ups)

References

External links
 
 
 

2000 births
Living people
Estonian female tennis players
Estonian people of Russian descent
Sportspeople from Saint Petersburg
21st-century Estonian women